Leland Sanford Austin (born March 26, 1986), better known by his stage name Yung L.A. or Da Boi Lay, is an American hip hop recording artist from Atlanta, Georgia. He is perhaps best known for his debut single "Ain't I", which peaked at number 47 on the US Billboard Hot 100 chart and at number seven on Billboards Hot R&B/Hip-Hop Songs chart. Austin's second single, titled "Futuristic Love (Elroy)", features American singer Ricco Barrino and was released in 2009.

Music career

2008–2011: Mixtapes and Futuristic Leland
In 2008, Austin was signed to American record executive T.I.'s Grand Hustle Records, after fellow Atlanta artist Young Dro found and brought Austin to the label. On April 12, 2008, Austin released his debut mixtape Offset Shawty. On November 25, 2008, Austin released his debut single, titled "Ain't I"; it features appearances from his fellow Grand Hustle label artist Young Dro and T.I., it went on to chart on the Billboard Hot 100 at number 47 and be certified platinum by the RIAA. On December 13, 2008, it was announced and confirmed that Austin had signed a label deal with Interscope Records and he was working on his debut album, titled Futuristic Leland. On December 28, 2008, Austin released his mixtape titled The Matrix.

On January 10, 2009, Austin released his first collaboration mixtape titled Black Boy Swag, White Boy Tags with Young Dro. On April 7, 2009, Austin released his second single titled "Futuristic Love (Elroy)"; it features Ricco Barrino, though it did not match the success of "Ain't I" it charted on the Billboard R&B/Hip-Hop chart at number 55. On June 2, 2009, Austin released his mixtape titled Lamborghini Leland. On November 5, 2009, Austin released his mixtape titled I Think I Can Sing. On December 14, 2009, Austin released his second collaboration mixtape, titled Batman & Robin (Superhero Language), with fellow Atlanta artist J Money aka J.Futuristic.

On February 24, 2010, Austin released his mixtape titled Crush Da Block. On February 24, 2010, Austin released his mixtape titled Suntrust Leland.

In early 2011 it was revealed that Austin had parted ways from Grand Hustle and was dropped from Interscope. It was also the shelving of his debut album Futuristic Leland. On September 16, 2011, Austin released his mixtape titled Crush Da Block 2.

2012: Check
In a March 27, 2012 interview Austin said he was "dropped from Interscope because my [second] single didn't match the success of the first one". He also said that he wished to leave Grand Hustle Records, that the label had failed him professionally by not following up his hit "Ain't I" with the release of his album, and failed him personally by ignoring him when he was hurt and had asked for their help and by entangling him in disputes that didn't involve him and had begun before he joined the label.

On November 27, 2012, Austin released his debut album titled Check; it was distributed by independent Atlanta based record label U-Digg Music Group.

2014–present: name change, mixtapes and TBA album
On November 19, 2014, Austin released his third collaboration mixtape titled Batman & Robin 2 (Superhero Language) with fellow Atlanta artist J Money which is a sequel to their first collaboration mixtape Batman & Robin (Superhero Language).

On February 5, 2015, it was revealed that Yung L.A. was working on a new mixtape titled Expensive Language. On March 27, 2015, Austin released his mixtape Expensive Language. Also on March 27, 2015, during an interview, Austin revealed that he had signed to record producer Zaytoven's label Zaytown USA. On August 7, 2015, Austin released a collaboration mixtape with the production team 808 Mafia titled 3 Way: 80Lay Mafia, and a second collaboration mixtape with producer's Zaytoven and Cassius Jay titled 3 Way: Dripset. Also on August 7, 2015, Austin released a third mixtape titled 3 Way: Foreign Water.

Controversy
In February 2011 Austin had the logo of a local record label tattooed on his face after a conversation with the label's CEO Big Bank Black. Black's brother Alley Boy, the label's co-CEO, demanded that Austin remove the tattoo because he wasn't signed to the label and wasn't given permission to use the logo. Austin countered that Alley Boy lacked the authority to make such a demand because Big Bank Black, not Alley Boy, was "the real CEO" of the label. He did though have a Los Angeles Dodgers logo tattooed over it two weeks later. Austin was set up and viciously assaulted by Alley Boy and members of his label; whether he was beaten before covering the tattoo or after wasn't known.

In April 2011, Austin was arrested for criminal damage to property and released on bail.

Discography

Check (2012)

Awards

BET Awards 
2009
 Best Collaboration for "Ain't I" (Nominated)

References

External links 

/ Rich Niggaz music video

1986 births
African-American male rappers
Grand Hustle Records artists
Interscope Records artists
Rappers from Atlanta
Southern hip hop musicians
Living people
21st-century American rappers
21st-century American male musicians
21st-century African-American musicians
20th-century African-American people